Marko Lazetić (born 22 January 2004) is a Serbian professional footballer who plays as a forward for Austrian Bundesliga club Rheindorf Altach, on loan from AC Milan.

Club career
On 29 November 2020, at the age of 16 years and 10 months, Lazetić made his debut for Red Star Belgrade as an 76th-minute substitute for Richmond Boakye against Rad. The home match finished as a 3–0 win for Red Star.

On 27 January 2022, five days after his 18th birthday, Lazetić joined Serie A club AC Milan for a fee believed to be in the region of €4 million, signing a deal until June 2026. He was assigned shirt number 22 and enlisted as a first team player. He debuted for the first team on 19 April, in a Coppa Italia match against cross-city rivals Inter, coming on as a substitute in the 86th minute.

On 8 November 2022, he made his Serie A debut in a 0–0 away draw against Cremonese. On 22 May 2022, as Milan won the scudetto on the last matchday of the Serie A season, Lazetić was awarded a winner's medal despite making no league appearances.

On 3 February 2023, he moved to Austrian Bundesliga club Rheindorf Altach on a six-month loan, joining his fellow AC Milan teammate Andreas Jungdal.

Career statistics

Club

Notes

Honours
AC Milan
Serie A: 2021–22

Red Star Belgrade
Serbian SuperLiga: 2021–22

References

External links
 
 

2004 births
Living people
Serbian footballers
Footballers from Belgrade
Association football forwards
Serbia youth international footballers
Red Star Belgrade footballers
A.C. Milan players
SC Rheindorf Altach players
Serbian SuperLiga players
Serie A players
Serbian expatriate footballers
Serbian expatriate sportspeople in Italy
Expatriate footballers in Italy
Serbian expatriate sportspeople in Austria
Expatriate footballers in Austria